Prothoe australis  is a butterfly in the family Nymphalidae. It was described by Félix Édouard Guérin-Méneville in 1831. It is found in the Australasian realm.

Subspecies
P. a. australis (Waigeu, Misool)
P. a. mulderi (Vollenhoven, 1863) (Batchian, Halmahera)
P. a. westwoodi Wallace, 1869 (Aru)
P. a. hewitsoni Wallace, 1869 (Irian Jaya)
P. a. layardi Godman & Salvin, 1882 (New Ireland)
P. a. schulzi Ribbe, 1898 (New Britain)
P. a. mafalda Fruhstorfer, 1906 (Papua)
P. a. menodora  Fruhstorfer, 1906 (British New Guinea)
P. a. decolorata Fruhstorfer, 1906 (Misool)
P. a. satgeii Joicey & Noakes, 1915 (Biak)

References

External links
"Prothoe Hübner, [1824]" at Markku Savela's Lepidoptera and Some Other Life Forms

Prothoe
Butterflies described in 1831